Jimmy Ronie Rudy De Jonghe (born 13 February 1992) is a Belgian footballer who plays as a left-back.

References

External links

1992 births
Living people
People from Boechout
Belgian footballers
Belgian Pro League players
Challenger Pro League players
Association football midfielders
Club Brugge KV players
S.V. Zulte Waregem players
Lierse S.K. players
K.S.V. Roeselare players
K.S.C. Lokeren Oost-Vlaanderen players
K Beerschot VA players
Liga I players
FC Argeș Pitești players
Belgium youth international footballers
Belgium under-21 international footballers
Belgian expatriate sportspeople in Romania
Expatriate footballers in Romania
Footballers from Antwerp Province